Owrtasu (also Romanized as Owrtāsū and Ūrtāsū) is a village in Charuymaq-e Sharqi Rural District of Shadian District, Charuymaq County, East Azerbaijan province, Iran. At the 2006 National Census, its population was 1,029 in 177 households. The following census in 2011 counted 1,278 people in 271 households. The latest census in 2016 showed a population of 1,201 people in 303 households; it was the largest village in its rural district.

References 

Charuymaq County

Populated places in East Azerbaijan Province

Populated places in Charuymaq County